Christopher William Gibbon Sanders (born 9 October 1998) is an English first-class cricketer.

Born at Stockport, Sanders was educated at Sedbergh School, where he played for the school cricket team. From Sedbergh, he went up to Loughborough University, where he made his debut in first-class cricket for Loughborough MCCU against Sussex at Hove in 2018. He played a further first-class match for Loughborough in 2018, against Lancashire. Sanders made his debut in minor counties cricket for Cheshire in 2017, appearing in two Minor Counties Championship matches to date.

References

External links

1998 births
Living people
Sportspeople from Stockport
People educated at Sedbergh School
Alumni of Loughborough University
English cricketers
Cheshire cricketers
Loughborough MCCU cricketers